Pierre Kogel (born 1887) was a Belgian footballer and coach. He was one of the founders of Standard de Liège, as well as its treasurer. Kogel was the goalkeeper for Standard de Liège when the club won its first D1 in 1909.

Career as player
 1902–1910 : Standard de Liège
38 matches, including 19 in D1.

Honours as player
 D2 Champions (Liège) in : 1905 – 1906 – 1907 – 1908
 D2 Champions in : 1909
The Champion D2 (Liège) won the chance to compete in the final round against the D2 Champions of Brabant, Flanders and Antwerp. Only one team were promoted to D1. It wasn't until the 5th attempt that Standard de Liège were able to join the élite.

Career as coach
1922–1924 : Standard de Liège

References

External links
 Player page

Belgian footballers
Belgium international footballers
Standard Liège players
Belgian football managers
Standard Liège managers
1887 births
Year of death missing
Association football goalkeepers